Eupatorium cannabinum, commonly known as hemp-agrimony, or holy rope, is a herbaceous plant in the family Asteraceae. It is a robust perennial native to Europe, NW. Africa, Turkey, Syria, Iran, Iraq, Jordan, the Caucasus and Central Asia. It is cultivated as an ornamental and occasionally found as a garden escape in scattered locations in China, the United States and Canada. It is extremely attractive to butterflies, much like buddleia.

If the genus Eupatorium is defined in a restricted sense (about 42 species), E. cannabinum is the only species of that genus native to Europe (with the remainder in Asia or North America).

Description
It lives in moist low-lying areas in temperate Eurasia. It is dioecious, with racemes of mauve flower heads which are pollinated by insects from July to early September. The flowers are visited by many types of insects, and can be characterized by a generalized pollination syndrome. The flower heads are tiny, fluffy and can be pale dusty pink or whitish. The fruit is an achene about 2 or 3 mm long, borne by a pappus with hairs 3 to 5 mm long, which is distributed by the wind. The plant over-winters as a hemicryptophyte.

Toxicity
Eupatorium cannabinum contains tumorigenic pyrrolizidine alkaloids. The alkaloids may be present in the plant material as their N-oxides.

Pharmacology

Chemistry and use in European folk medicine
Eupatorium cannabinum is used in the European traditional medicine as anti-inflammatory agent for respiratory tract diseases, and several of its sesquiterpene lactone constituents were identified to have anti-inflammatory effect in isolated human neutrophils, with the anti-inflammatory action of the sesquiterpene lactone eupatoriopicrin being verified also in mouse peritonitis model.

Use to stop bleeding in folk medicine of Sikkim
E. cannabinum, known locally by the Nepali names of Banmara and Kalijhar, is used as a styptic in the traditional medicine of the Indian state of Sikkim in the Eastern Himalayas (to which the plant is not native, but an introduction).
The leaves and tender stems are crushed fresh and the juice is applied to cuts and bruises. Sometimes, when the wound is large, the squeezed remains of the plant are placed over the wound in the form of a poultice. The bleeding stops immediately and the wound is protected from infection.  

Subspecies
Eupatorium cannabinum L. subsp. cannabinum - most of species range
Eupatorium cannabinum L. subsp. corsicum (Req. ex Loisel.) P.Fourn. - Corsica, Sardinia, Basilicata, Apulia

References

External links

cannabinum
Plants described in 1753
Flora of Europe
Taxa named by Carl Linnaeus